Sandra Mitchell Carpenter (1934–2003) was an American corporate executive, engineer, and information technology professional. During the 1980s,  Carpenter served as corporate vice president for information management systems at Hilton Hotels. She was one of the first women to serve as a chief information officer (CIO) at a company with more than $1 billion in revenue. During her tenure at Hilton, CIO magazine named the company to their list of the top ten travel service IT Innovators. Carpenter also received placement on CIO Magazine's list of the top 100 CIOs.

Early life and education

Carpenter was born in Des Moines, Iowa on February 4, 1934. She grew up in several Midwestern cities and then in Short Hills, New Jersey. In 1952, Carpenter graduated from the Beard School in Orange, NJ (now Morristown-Beard School). She then completed her bachelor's degree in literature at Smith College in Northampton, MA in 1956. Carpenter co-chaired a reception of the Smith College Clubs of Los Angeles and Pasadena to launch the $125 million fundraising campaign for the school in 1988.

Information technology career

In the 1960s, Carpenter joined IBM as a systems engineer, instructor, and sales representative. She was the first woman to take on all three of these roles at the company. Carpenter later served as director of information systems at Quanex Corp., an industrial company in Houston, Texas, and chief information officer at Rosenbluth Travel in Philadelphia during the 1990s.

Rosenbluth, the fifth largest travel agency in the U.S. at the time, had a corporate client list that included Walmart, DuPont, Nike, Inc., and Chevron Corporation. (After its 2003 acquisition by American Express, Rosenblauth's operations now work as the American Express Business Travel division.) Carpenter led the automation of Rosenblauth's booking system, which had previously relied on manual entry. In a 1992 profile of her work written by CIO magazine, Carpenter outlined five critical elements for IT innovation at Rosenblauth:

 Staff Nurturing Programs
 Contact between Information Systems and Customers
 Team Decision-Making
 Concurrent Development Methods
 Toleration for Failures

Service work

Carpenter founded the first woman's shelter in the Detroit, Michigan suburbs. She helped organize the Michigan chapter of the National Organization for Women (NOW) and served as the founding president of NOW's Oakland County chapter. in 1975, the Wayne County chapter of NOW awarded Carpenter their Feminist of the Year Award.

Family

After her college studies, Sandra Carpenter married Nick de Kuyper and moved to Europe to live with de Kuyper. They had one son, John. They divorced in 1961. In 1964, Sandra Carpenter married widower Robert Carpenter. She adopted his four children: Robert, John, Kristin and Charles. Sandra Carpenter and Robert Carpenter divorced in 1980.

References

American women engineers
American chief technology officers
IBM employees
American women's rights activists
Smith College alumni
Businesspeople from Des Moines, Iowa
1934 births
2003 deaths
American women chief executives
Chief information officers
Morristown-Beard School alumni
People from Millburn, New Jersey
20th-century American businesspeople
20th-century American businesswomen
21st-century American women